Sisu KB-124 was a two-axle lorry and special vehicle chassis made by the Finnish heavy vehicle manufacturer Suomen Autoteollisuus (SAT). It was a six-tonne delivery lorry which was developed to follow the KB-24. The KB-124 was produced from 1961 until 1968, when it was replaced by the similar KB-121 with increased permitted load. Production ceased in about 1972.

The marketing name for the vehicle was Nalle-Sisu, "Teddy-Bear-Sisu". In addition to lorries, the chassis was bodied as fire engines, mobile shops and small buses by coachbuilders.

Development
The old-fashioned looking cabin of the KB-24 was modernised in the KB-124 and made more spacious to make it competitive with the Volvo Snabbe. As a drawback, the vehicle lost a part of its key strength, agility. The new Nalle could not be driven through some of the tightest curves, which the KB-24 still could handle.

Production
The main customers were Finnish government institutions. At the beginning of November 1968 the State Council approved an order of 50–60 Nalle-Sisus, of which 34 units were for Post and Telegraph Administration, 15 for the State Railways, and few units were for other public institutions. Initially the State Railways had suggested purchasing Fargo FK 500 lorries instead because their unit price was just 16 200 marks, instead of Sisu's 20 612 marks. However, the domestic origin weighed in favour of Sisus.

Selecting the domestic option was not self-evident. At the time, there were many  news articles for and against the domestic options. In 1971 the state chose buying 53 Fargos for a total of 1.2 million marks; the minister of transport, K. F. Haapasalo, commented that the domestic vehicle production was "small-time business".

SAT tried to end the Nalle production several times, but each time some government institution decided to order a series of a few dozen units, which the company then produced.

Technical data

Engine

At the beginning the engine selection consisted the same models which were used in the previous KB-24: the utterly outdated, in-house produced four-cylinder 3.5-litre Sisu AMA side valve petrol engine with an output of 70 hp, and four-cylinder 3.6-litre Ford Dagenham diesel with the same output.

A stronger 4-cylinder 4.16-litre Ford Dagenham diesel with 84 horsepower was introduced in 1967.

Chassis and transmission

The clutch with  diameter is dry single-plate type and features torsional damping. The gearbox includes four speed forward and reverse; the second, third and fourth gear are with synchromesh. The transmission shaft has two universal joints. The rear axle has a hypoid gear set.

The forged front axle beam is I-profile shape and there is a drop in the middle. The axles are produced by Kirkstall. Both front and rear axle are equipped with telescopic shock absorbers. The standard wheel size is 7.50 – 16" and 5.50 – 20" was available as an option.

The service brake consists of hydraulically operated drum brakes, which are same size on the front and the rear axle. Initially a dual-circuit system with vacuum servo was optional; later servo became standard. The handbrake works mechanically.

Steering system is worm gear type.

Cabin and superstructures
The full-steel cabin used on lorry models represents own production of SAT. Compared to the previous model, it was more upholstered and better insulated. In cabin design the producer had paid attention on good visibility. The windscreen is split and both halves are curved. Both sides have separate windscreen wipers. An extended five-seat cabin was available as a special order.

The electrical system is 12-volt and the vehicle is equipped with an 84-Ah battery. A 146-Ah battery was available as an option. The bus chassis were delivered with a  tank which was optionally available for lorries as well.

Dimensions and weights

Characteristics
The contemporary standard pallets could not be placed two-across the width.

Sources

References

Kb124
Vehicles introduced in 1961